Järjestyshäiriö was a Finnish pop rock band, founded in 1997 in the town of Jyväskylä by members Juho Markkanen, Mikko Manninen, and Juha Ryhänen, with Matti Keränen and Sirja Minkovitsch joining later on in the groups lifetime. Their influences include Eppu Normaali, Depeche Mode, and Queen.

Their first album, Tuhlatut päivät, valvotut yöt, was released by Spinefarm Records in 2005. After the first album by Spinefarm, they turned to the Lahti-based recording company Levy-yhtiö, which released their second album Takapihojen rocktähdet syksyllä in 2006. In the autumn of 2007, Takapihojen rocktähdet syksyllä was re-released as Takapihojen Rocktähdet+ in a USB-friendly format. This was Finland's first ever music album released in USB format.

In 2008, the band signed a contract with Warner Music Finland, and in 2009 released their third album Lopullinen ratkaisu. One of the singles in the album, Karkuri, managed to become the most downloaded song in Finland for a short period of time, and was played on the popular Finnish radio station YleX. In Finland's music charts, it succeeded the Eurovision Song Contest 2009 winner Alexander Rybak's song Fairytale.

The group, by 2010, was working on a fourth studio album. Jyrki Tuovisen, a fellow singer and sound engineer, said the album will be released on 20 February 2015. Järjestyshäiriö's first standalone single, Rantakatu, was released in March 2014.

The group competed in the Uuden Musiikin Kilpailu 2015 with the song Särkyneiden sydänten kulmilla. The song progressed from the third semi-final, and competed to represent Finland in the Eurovision Song Contest 2015. They came in last place.

In November 2015, they announced that they would break up in January 2016.

Discography

Albums

EPs

Singles

Music videos
 Tahtoisin (2006)
 Karkuri (2009 – dir. Jesse Hietanen)
 Rantakatu (2014)
 Särkyneiden sydänten kulmilla (2015)

References

Finnish rock music groups
Finnish pop music groups